Henry Charles Littlewort (7 July 1882 – 21 November 1934) was an English amateur footballer who competed in the 1912 Summer Olympics.

He was part of the English team, which won the gold medal in the football tournament. He played all three matches.

Littlewort played one match for Crystal Palace on 19 January 1907. Littlewort played as a centre half in the away match against Fulham which Palace lost 2–1.

Personal life 
Littlewort served as a sergeant in the Royal Fusiliers during the First World War.

References

External links

1882 births
1934 deaths
Military personnel from Suffolk
English footballers
English Olympic medallists
England amateur international footballers
Crystal Palace F.C. players
Southern Football League players
Footballers at the 1912 Summer Olympics
Olympic footballers of Great Britain
Olympic gold medallists for Great Britain
Olympic medalists in football
Medalists at the 1912 Summer Olympics
Association football outside forwards
English Football League players
Fulham F.C. players
Shepherd's Bush F.C. players
Glossop North End A.F.C. players
Arsenal F.C. players
British Army personnel of World War I
Royal Fusiliers soldiers